Germylenes are a class of germanium(II) compounds with the general formula :GeR2. They are heavier carbene analogs. However, unlike carbenes, whose ground state can be either singlet or triplet depending on the substituents, germylenes have exclusively a singlet ground state. Unprotected carbene analogs, including germylenes, has a dimerization nature. Free germylenes can be isolated under the stabilization of steric hindrance or electron donation. The synthesis of first stable free dialkyl germylene was reported by Jutzi, et al in 1991.

Structures and bonding 
Bonding situation for germylene is distinctively different from that for its light analog carbene. The carbon atom from carbene is sp2 hybridized. Although germylenes still have some sp2 hybridization character, the larger energy gap between s and p-orbitals for germanium permits the retainment of 4s24p2 electron configuration to some degree. The bond angle for H2Ge and Me2Ge was found to be: H-Ge-H 93° and C-Ge-C: 98°, which is smaller than 120°, the ideal bond angle for sp2 hybridized structure and thus proves the 4s24p2 valence electron configuration nature of germylene. The lone pair of germylene tends to stay in the high-s-character orbital which is relatively inert, making germylene exclusively singlet.

Dimerization of germylenes lead to the formation of germylene dimers (R2Ge=GeR2). It was found that multiple bonds between germanium atoms are not necessarily classical σ and π bonds as found for carbene dimers (alkenes), but can rather be regarded as donor–acceptor adducts of a trans-bent structure.

Synthesis

Stabilization 
Dimerization of free germylenes does not have a noticeable energy barrier, which means that the dimerization reaction is almost spontaneous and diffusion limited, so the free germylene monomers without stabilization could dimerize or further polymerize once they form. Free germylenes have to be stabilized kinetically or thermodynamically due to their high reactivity originating from the vacant p-orbital. Thermodynamical stabilization of this p-orbital is usually realized by coordination of a pentamethylcyclopentadiene (Cp*) ligand or of nitrogen (N), oxygen (O) or phosphorus (P) containing ligands, which are able to donate electrons and thus deactivate the vacant p-orbitals. At the same time, stabilization can be accomplished by steric protection of bulky R groups like mesityl groups (Mes) to prevent nucleophiles from getting close to the germanium center.

Synthesis of carbon substituted germylenes 
Carbon substituents is different from other heteroatom N, O, P substituents which have lone pairs in that they provide less electronic perturbations. As a result, a stronger steric and electronic stabilization is required to guarantee a monomeric product. Carbon substituted germylenes can be synthesized using various methods: (1) reduction of dibromogermanes with reducing agents like lithium naphthalene (LiNp) or potassium graphite (KC8), etc., (2) photolysis of strained cyclogermanes or Ge(IV) species, (3) substitution of a dihalo Ge(II) precursor species with nucleophiles like organometallic ligands (e.g. RLi/RMgBr).

Synthesis of n-heterocyclic germylene and cyclic(alkyl)(amino)germylene 
The introduction of heteroatom in the ligand backbone enhances the stability of reactive Ge(II) center by electron donation from N lone pair to vacant p-orbitals of germanium center. Typically, the strategy for synthesizing five-membered N-heterocyclic tetrylene involves the reaction between N-substituted 1,4-diaza-1,3-butadiene, the alkali metal based reducing agents and group 14 halides. In the case of n-heterocyclic germylene (NHGe) synthesis, the method involves an initial reduction of N-substituted 1,4-diaza-1,3-butadiene by lithium. The following cyclization of the dianion with the corresponding Ge(II) halides gives the final product.

The cyclic(alkyl)(amino)carbenes (CAACs) has already been known as both a better donor and better acceptor than n-heterocyclic carbenes (NHCs) due to its higher highest occupied molecular orbital (HOMO) and lower lowest unoccupied molecular orbital (LUMO). 

The synthetic strategy of CAAGe involves the synthesis of a α-β-unsaturated imine from a ketone and an amine via condensation followed by the treatment with GeCl2·dioxane. The resulting product is then reduced with KC8 to give CAAGe. Analogous to CAAC, the electrophilicity of the germanium center can be obviously enhanced by the substitution of a π-donating and σ-withdrawing amino group along with σ-donating trimethylsilyl groups.

Synthesis of a unique homoconjugation stabilized germylene 
In 2016, Muller et al reported the synthesis of a unique homoconjugation stabilized germylene in a relatively high yield by the reaction between hafnocene dichloride and dipotassium germacyclopentadienediide in THF at -80 °C. The product is stabilized by a remote interaction between a C=C double bond and vacant p-orbital of Ge center through homoconjugation. This stabilization strategy results in a special structural which possesses unusual reactivity.

Synthesis of PGeP pincer compounds 
The pincer based germylene is of great importance not only for their ability to stabilize transition metal species via chelation effects in homogeneous catalysis, but also for its serving as a good luminescence source. A PNHNHP ligand was used to synthesize the PGeP pincer stabilized germylene by treatment with two equivalents of potassium hexamethyldisilazide (KHMDS) and GeCl2·dioxane, which finally leads to the formation of the PGeP pincer compound.

Reactivity

Oligomerization and polymerization 
Dimerization of carbon substituted germylenes gives R2Ge=GeR2 dimers which could further polymerize to form polygermanes (R2Ge)n compounds. The dimer could show a certain stability if prepared in an independent way. Bulkier substituents are able to reduce the polymerization rate by steric effect. More steric hindrance could even stop the polymerization or dimerization reactions and renders a germylene thermodynamically stable.

Insertion into σ bond 
R2Ge insertion into C-C bonds has not been reported so far. However, going down the group 14, C-E (E = Si, Ge, Sn, Pb) bonds become more accessible for R2Ge insertion. The strained C-Ge bonds allow insertion of germylene to 7,7-dialkyl-7-germanorbornadienes in the melt, forming digermabicy-clooctadienes.

C-H bonds are generally unreactive toward germylene insertion. However, strain release may help to overcome the activation energy barrier.

Insertion to carbon-halide bonds is common for germylene. The mechanism for insertion of free Me2Ge into the C-Br bond of benzyl bromide was reported to be a two-step, radical abstraction-recombination process under thermal and photolytical conditions. An identical mechanism through a caged singlet radical pair was proposed for C-Cl bond insertion. However, the interaction between halogen electrons and empty p-orbital of the germylene may result in the formation of a donor-acceptor complex before occurrence of any of the insertion mechanisms.

The insertion into the C-Hal bond in alkyne compounds go by a one-step mechanism under thermal or photolytical conditions.

For C-O, the R2Ge insertion product could only remain stable at a very low temperature.

Addition to unsaturated systems 
Addition reaction of Me2Ge to unsaturated systems is well studied. As mentioned above, dimerization and polymerization of Me2Ge does not have a noticeable activation energy barrier and is only controlled by diffusion. As a result, addition reactions should be rapid enough complete before getting polygermanes as products.
There is no reaction between simple alkenes and free germylenes. However, styrenes and α-substituted styrenes are able to react with Me2Ge. The resulting product is a 1:1 mixture of the syn and anti-isomers of 3,4-diphenyl-3,4-R-1,1-dimethyl-1-germacyclopentane.A variety of 1,2-substituted-vinylgermyl compounds can be synthesized in both high yield and high regioselectivity by addition of germylene to alkynes.

1,4-Cycloaddition of conjugated (hetero-)dienes by free germylenes gives the corresponding 5-membered ring.

Germylenes reacts only with one of the strained double bonds in cumulated systems like allenes (C=C=C). Germylenes prefer to react with more electron-deficient allenes.

Complexation by donors 
During complexation with donors, the germylenes stay in the singlet ground state, where the lone pair is placed in the high-s-character orbital, while the heteroatom-containing donors like R2O, ROH, R2S, R3P, R3N and RCl interact with the vacant p-orbital at germanium center, which could stabilize the singlet germylene and prevent further polymerization. Most of the complexes are stable in room temperature. The absorption bands of adducts commonly exhibits shorter wavelengths in comparison to those of the free germylenes due to substituent-influenced n-p transitions at the Ge center.

Germylene catalyzed reaction 
Germylenes could also act as catalysts as transition metals do. Oxidative addition and reductive elimination, along with the related Mn+/M(n+2)+ redox couples are of great significance to the transition metal catalysis. Due to the electronic structure and chemical properties of germylenes, including the empty p-orbital, germylenes are able to activated small molecules and give the corresponding Ge(IV) complexes, which raised researchers' interests in germylenes' acting as spectator ligands in certain catalytic cycles. However, subsequent regeneration of Ge(II) compound through reductive elimination is not thermodynamically favored for germylenes.[11] The key of germylene catalysis chemistry is to maintain a balance between oxidative addition and reductive elimination. One example of germylene catalyzed reaction is hydroboration of CO2, where a preliminary hydrogermylation of CO2 step is followed by the formation of methanol derivatives with 3 equivalent of catecholborane to regenerate the germylene compound.

See also 

 Carbene analogs
 Silylene
 Stannylene

References 

Organogermanium compounds